Pete Alvanos is an American high school sports administrator and  former college football coach. He is the athletic director at North County High School in Glen Burnie, Maryland. position he had held since 2018. Avavanos served  as the head football coach Swarthmore College in Swarthmore, Pennsylvania from 1998 to 2000 and Hamilton College in Clinton, New York from 2001 to 2005, compiling a career college football coaching record of 10–56. He was the final head coach of the Swarthmore Garnet Tide football program, which was disbanded after the 2000 season.

Head coaching record

References

Year of birth missing (living people)
Living people
Chicago Maroons football coaches
Hamilton Continentals football coaches
Lehigh Mountain Hawks football coaches
Louisville Cardinals football coaches
Navy Midshipmen football coaches
Redlands Bulldogs football coaches
Swarthmore Garnet Tide football coaches
Drexel University alumni